Adalatti  is a village in the southern state of Karnataka, India. It is located in the Athni taluk of Belgaum district in Karnataka.

See also
Athani
 Belgaum
 Districts of Karnataka

References

External links
 http://Belgaum.nic.in/

Villages in Belagavi district